Robert Zelwin Aliber (born September 19, 1930) is a professor emeritus of International Economics and Finance at the University of Chicago.  He is best known for his contribution to the theory of foreign direct investment. He has given the concept of foreign exchange rate in foreign direct investment. Aliber argues that a multinational corporation from hard currency area can borrow at lower rates in a soft currency country than can local firms.

Life 
Aliber received a Bachelor of Arts degree from Williams College (1952) and Bachelor of Arts (1954) and a Master of Arts (1957) from Cambridge University. He received his Ph.D. from Yale University. He has been a staff economist at the Commission on Money and Credit (1959–61) and at the Committee for Economic Development (1961–64). Aliber served as a senior economic advisor at the United States Agency for International Development (1964–65). He was appointed as an associate professor at the University of Chicago in 1964.

He is mentioned in Michael Lewis' book  Travels in the New Third World as having predicted the Icelandic financial crisis several years before it happened.

Notes

External links
 Personal page at Carnegie Council for Ethics in International Affair
 Publications by Robert Z. Aliber
 Business Forecast 2009

Alumni of the University of Cambridge
American economists
University of Chicago faculty
1930 births
Living people
Williams College alumni
Yale University alumni
American expatriates in the United Kingdom